Lindsey Hermer-Bell is a Canadian production designer based in Toronto, Ontario.

Designer career 
Born in Johannesburg, South Africa, Lindsey Hermer-Bell moved to Canada in 1977. She received a bachelor's degree in architecture from the University of Toronto.

She began her career as designer on the 1983 HBO drama Between Friends. Her production design credits include the feature film Shake Hands with the Devil (2007), for which she received nominations for both a Genie Award and a Directors Guild of Canada award. Her credits for television include the meticulous construction of the brownstone house of Nero Wolfe for the A&E original film The Golden Spiders: A Nero Wolfe Mystery (2000) and the subsequent series, A Nero Wolfe Mystery (2001–2002).
Her production design for the TV series Murdoch Mysteries was nominated for a DGC Craft Award in 2009.

Squash career
Hermer-Bell was a member of Team Canada in squash at the 1993 Maccabiah Games.  She won the Canadian Women's Doubles Championships in 2006 and 2007 with Leslie Freeman.

Filmography

Awards 
2007, Nominee, Genie AwardBest Achievement in Art Direction/Production DesignShake Hands with the Devil(shared with Justin Craig)Academy of Canadian Cinema and Television
2007, Nominee, DGA Craft AwardProduction Design – Feature FilmShake Hands with the DevilDirectors Guild of Canada
2009, Nominee, DGA Craft AwardProduction Design – Television SeriesMurdoch Mysteries, "Shades of Grey"Directors Guild of Canada

References

External links 
 

Canadian art directors
Living people
Canadian production designers
Canadian set decorators
Competitors at the 1993 Maccabiah Games
Jewish Canadian sportspeople
Maccabiah Games squash players
Maccabiah Games competitors for Canada
People from Johannesburg
People from Toronto
South African emigrants to Canada
University of Toronto alumni
Year of birth missing (living people)